Christopher Julius Rock (born February 7, 1965) is an American stand-up comedian, actor, and filmmaker. Rock gained prominence as a stand-up comedian, who with his edgy humor and quick wit tackled subjects such as race relations, human sexuality, and observational humor. He is also known for his work in film, television and stage, he has received multiple accolades, including three Grammy Awards for best comedy album and four Primetime Emmy Awards as well as a Golden Globe Award nomination. He was ranked No. 5 on Comedy Central's list of the 100 Greatest Stand-ups of All Time. He also ranked No. 5 on Rolling Stones list of the 50 Best Stand-Up Comics of All Time.

After years working as a stand-up comedian and appearing in minor film roles including Beverly Hills Cop II (1987), Rock gained prominence as a cast member on the NBC sketch comedy series Saturday Night Live from 1990 to 1993. While at SNL, he appeared in the films New Jack City (1991), Boomerang (1992) and CB4 (1993), which he also wrote and produced. He reached mainstream stardom with the critically acclaimed Bring the Pain in 1996. Rock continued making popular specials which include Bigger & Blacker (1999), Never Scared (2004), Kill the Messenger (2008), Tamborine (2018), and Selective Outrage (2023).
He developed, wrote, produced and narrated the sitcom Everybody Hates Chris (2005-2009), which was based on his early life. From 1997 to 2000 HBO aired his critically acclaimed talk show The Chris Rock Show.

Rock was cast in starring film roles in Nurse Betty (1999), Down to Earth, Pootie Tang (both 2001), Head of State (2003), The Longest Yard (2005), the Madagascar film series (2005–2012), I Think I Love My Wife (2007), Death at a Funeral (2010), Grown Ups (2010), its sequel Grown Ups 2 (2013), Top Five (2014) and Spiral (2021). He is known for his appearances in television including Louie, Comedians in Cars Getting Coffee, Fargo. He made his Broadway theater debut in the 2011 Stephen Adly Guirgis play The Motherfucker with the Hat. He hosted the Academy Awards twice; in 2005 and 2016, and was involved in an incident with Will Smith on stage at the 2022 Awards.

Early life
Rock was born in Andrews, South Carolina on February 7, 1965. Shortly after his birth, his parents moved to the Crown Heights neighborhood of Brooklyn, New York. A few years later, they relocated and settled in the working class area of Bedford–Stuyvesant. His mother, Rosalie (née Tingman), was a teacher and social worker for the mentally handicapped; his father, Julius Rock, was a truck driver and newspaper deliveryman. Julius died in 1988 after ulcer surgery.

Rock is the eldest of his parents' seven children (six boys and one girl), and he had an older paternal half-brother, Charles Ledell Rock, who died in 2006 after suffering from alcoholism. Rock's younger brothers Tony, Kenny, and Jordan are also in the entertainment business.

Rock's family history was profiled on the PBS series African American Lives 2 in 2008. A DNA test showed that he is of Cameroonian descent, specifically from the Udeme (Ouldémé) people of northern Cameroon. Rock's great-great-grandfather, Julius Caesar Tingman, was enslaved for 21 years before serving in the American Civil War as part of the United States Colored Troops. During the 1940s, Rock's paternal grandfather moved from South Carolina to New York City to become a taxicab driver and preacher.

Rock was bused to schools in predominantly white neighborhoods of Brooklyn, where he endured bullying and beatings from white students. As he grew older, the bullying worsened and Rock's parents pulled him out of James Madison High School. He dropped out of high school altogether, but he later earned a General Educational Development (GED). Rock then worked various jobs at fast-food restaurants.

Career

Early work
Rock began working as a stand-up comic during 1984 in New York City's Catch a Rising Star. Upon seeing his act at a nightclub, Eddie Murphy befriended and mentored the aspiring comic. Murphy gave Rock his first film role and big break in Beverly Hills Cop II. Rock rose up the ranks of the comedy circuit in addition to earning bit roles in the film I'm Gonna Git You Sucka and the TV series Miami Vice.

Saturday Night Live and stand-up success
Rock was a cast member of the sketch comedy series Saturday Night Live from 1990 to 1993. He and other new cast members Chris Farley, Adam Sandler, Rob Schneider and David Spade became known as the Bad Boys of SNL. In 1991, he released his first comedy album, Born Suspect and won acclaim for his role as a crack addict in the film New Jack City. His tenure on SNL gave Rock national exposure.  (Rock has hosted SNL three times; in 1996, 2014 and 2020.)

With plans to leave Saturday Night Live after the 1992–93 season, Rock was effectively "fired" from the show. Beginning that fall, he appeared in six episodes of the predominantly African American sketch show In Living Color as a special guest star. The show was canceled a month after he arrived. Rock then wrote and starred in the low-budget comedy CB4, which made $18 million against its budget of $6 million. He signed on as client of 3 Arts Entertainment.

Rock headlined his first HBO comedy special in 1994, titled Big Ass Jokes, as part of HBO Comedy Half-Hour. His second special, 1996's Bring the Pain, made Rock one of the most acclaimed and commercially successful comedians in the industry. Rock won two Emmy Awards for the special and gained large critical acclaim. A controversial part of the special was "Niggas vs. Black People".

For his much-publicized role as a commentator for Comedy Central's Politically Incorrect during the 1996 Presidential elections, he earned another Emmy nomination. Rock also was the voice for the "Lil Penny" puppet who was the alter ego to basketball star Penny Hardaway in a series of Nike shoe commercials from 1994 to 1998, and hosted the '97 MTV Video Music Awards.

Rock later had two more HBO comedy specials: Bigger & Blacker in 1999, and Never Scared in 2004. Articles relating to both specials called Rock "the funniest man in America" in Time and Entertainment Weekly. HBO also aired his talk show, The Chris Rock Show, which gained critical acclaim for Rock's interviews with celebrities and politicians. The show won an Emmy for writing. His television work has won him a total of three Emmy Awards and 15 nominations.

By the end of the decade, Rock was established as one of the preeminent stand-up comedians and comic minds of his generation. During this time, Rock also translated his comedy into print form in the book Rock This! and released the Grammy Award-winning comedy albums, Roll with the New, Bigger & Blacker and Never Scared. Rock's fifth HBO special, Kill the Messenger, premiered on September 27, 2008, and won him another Emmy for outstanding writing for a variety or music program.

On October 30, 2016, Netflix announced that they would be releasing two new stand-up comedy specials from Rock, with Rock being paid $40 million per special. The first special, Chris Rock: Tamborine, was released on Netflix on February 14, 2018. It was filmed at the Brooklyn Academy of Music and was directed by comedian Bo Burnham. The specials marked the comedian's first concert specials released in 10 years. The special earned a Grammy Award for Best Comedy Album nomination.

On March 4, 2023, Rock returned to Netflix with Chris Rock: Selective Outrage, the streamer's first-ever live event. The show streamed live from the Hippodrome Theatre in Baltimore, Maryland.

Film star

1990s 
It was not until the success of his stand-up act in the late 1990s that Rock began receiving leading man status in films. He began the decade with supporting roles in such films as New Jack City (1991) as crack addict Pookie, in the Eddie Murphy comedy Boomerang (1992), the Steve Martin comedy Sgt. Bilko (1996) as well as Beverly Hills Ninja (1997), and Lethal Weapon 4 (1998).

He also appeared in the Kevin Smith fantasy comedy film Dogma (1999). The film received positive reviews and premiered at the Cannes Film Festival. The film starred an ensemble cast with actors such as Ben Affleck, Matt Damon, Alan Rickman, Salma Hayek, and George Carlin. He then starred in the dark comedy Nurse Betty (2000) starring Renée Zellweger, Greg Kinnear and Morgan Freeman which also debuted at the Cannes Film Festival on May 11, 2000. The film was a critical success.

2000s 
In the later 2000s, Rock started to work increasingly behind the camera. He wrote the film Down to Earth (2001) along with friend and comedian Louis C.K. The film was based on the Warren Beatty film, Heaven Can Wait (1978). That same year Rock also produced and starred in the C.K. directed film Pootie Tang (2001). Rock also would work as a writer and director of the political comedy Head of State (2003) and marital comedy I Think I Love My Wife (2007). He also played the lead in both films. He also went on to star in films like The Longest Yard (2005) opposite Adam Sandler, and the action comedy film Bad Company (2002) opposite Anthony Hopkins.

Starting in 2005, Rock has also voiced the eccentric zebra Marty in DreamWorks' animated film franchise Madagascar. He starred in two of the film's sequels, Madagascar: Escape 2 Africa (2008), and Madagascar 3: Europe's Most Wanted (2013). In 2007 Rock voiced Mooseblood the Mosquito in the Jerry Seinfeld animated film, The Bee Movie.

In 2009, Rock released his first documentary, 2009's Good Hair. The film focuses on the issue of how African-American women have perceived their hair and historically styled it. The film explores the current styling industry for black women, images of what is considered acceptable and desirable for African American women's hair in the United States, and their relation to African American culture. The film premiered at the 2009 Sundance Film Festival where it earned critical acclaim and received a Special Jury Prize. The National Board of Review named it one of the five best documentaries of the year. Rock was also nominated for the Gotham Award for Best Documentary and for the Best Documentary Screenplay from the Writers Guild of America. Rock has since stated working on a documentary about debt called Credit Is the Devil.

2010s 

Some of his 2010s film appearances include the black comedy Death at a Funeral (2010) a remake of the British comedy of the same name. The film starred Peter Dinklage, Martin Lawrence, Tracy Morgan, Kevin Hart, Zoe Saldana, and Luke Wilson. The film received mixed reviews, although Roger Ebert, critic of The Chicago Sun-Times, praised the film writing: "I laughed all the way through, in fact. This is the best comedy since The Hangover, and although it's almost a scene-by-scene remake of a 2007 British movie with the same title, it's funnier than the original." Rock also starred in the summer comedy Grown Ups (2010) alongside Adam Sandler, Kevin James, David Spade and Maya Rudolph.

In 2012, he starred in the ensemble romantic comedy film What to Expect When You're Expecting alongside Cameron Diaz, Jennifer Lopez, Anna Kendrick, and Elizabeth Banks. Despite earning negative reviews, the film was a financial success. Rock earned a Teen Choice Award for Choice Movie Actor – Comedy nomination for his performance. That same year he starred in the romantic comedy 2 Days in New York (2012) opposite Julie Delpy. The film served as the sequel to Delpy's previous film, 2 Days in Paris (2007). The film premiered at the Sundance Film Festival where it received positive reviews, with critics praising the chemistry between the two with Todd McCarthy of The Hollywood Reporter writing: "The best of the humor is verbal and attitudinal, all delivered at a rapid clip in overlapping languages that Preston Sturges or Howard Hawks would have admired."

In 2014, Rock scripted, directed and starred in the film Top Five, which critics have drawn comparison to Woody Allen's Stardust Memories (1980). The film is a social commentary on fame and society. The film premiered at the 2014 Toronto International Film Festival. Scott Foundas, critic for Variety praised the film writing: "Rock has finally found a big-screen vehicle for himself that comes close to capturing the electric wit, shrewd social observations and deeply autobiographical vein of his standup comedy." In Rolling Stone magazine, Peter Travers wrote in his review: "Rock delivers the laughs, big ones, laced with razor-sharp observations on everything from pop culture to racial politics... His confident, prowling wit as a stand-up has finally found its way to the screen, enhanced by a bracing vulnerability. Top Five is Rock's best movie by a mile."

In 2015, Rock appeared as himself in Sofia Coppola's Christmas musical special, A Very Murray Christmas starring Bill Murray. In the film, Rock sings "Do You Hear What I Hear?" with Murray. The film debuted on Netflix and received the Primetime Emmy Award for Outstanding Television Movie.

He also appeared as himself in another Netflix film, Sandy Wexler (2017) starring Adam Sandler. In 2018, he starred in the Netflix comedy The Week Of directed by Robert Smigel starring Sandler. The film follows two fathers during the week of the wedding of their children. The following year, he briefly appeared in the comedy film Dolemite Is My Name (2019) starring Eddie Murphy. In the film, Murphy portrayed Rudy Ray Moore and centers around his career as a standup, and director of blaxploitation starting with Dolemite (1975). The film premiered at the Toronto International Film Festival.

In 2021, he starred in a reboot of the Saw franchise, Spiral (2021), which dabbled into the territory of the horror film genre.

Everybody Hates Chris (2005–2009)

In the fall of 2005, the UPN television network premiered a comedy series called Everybody Hates Chris, loosely based on Rock's school days, of which he is the executive producer and narrator. The show has garnered both critical and ratings success. The series was nominated for a 2006 Golden Globe for Best TV Series (Musical or Comedy), a 2006 People's Choice Award for Favorite New Television Comedy, and two 2006 Emmy Awards for costuming and cinematography.

He produced the series Totally Biased with W. Kamau Bell, which premiered in August 2012. While serving as producer, he had a production company, Chris Rock Enterprises (or CR Enterprises) for short.

Academy Awards

2005 ceremony 
In February 2005, Rock hosted the 77th Academy Awards ceremony. The decision to have Rock host the awards was seen by some as a chance to bring an "edge" to the ceremony, and to make it more relevant or appealing to younger audiences. Jokingly, Rock opened by saying "Welcome to the 77th and LAST Academy Awards!" During one segment Rock asked, "Who is this guy?" in reference to actor Jude Law seemingly appearing in every movie Rock had seen that year and implied Law was a low-rent Tom Cruise (he made a joke about filmmakers rushing production when unable to get the actors they want: "If you want Tom Cruise and all you can get is Jude Law, wait [to make the film]!"). Subsequently, an angry Sean Penn took the stage to present and said, "In answer to our host's question, Jude Law is one of our finest young actors." (At the time, Penn and Law were shooting All the King's Men.) Law was not the only actor that Rock roasted that evening, however—he turned the joke on himself at one point, saying, "If you want Denzel [Washington] and all you can get is me, wait!" Older Oscar officials were reportedly displeased with Rock's performance, which did not elevate ratings for the ceremony. Rock was also criticized for referring to the Oscars as "idiotic", and asserting that heterosexual men do not watch them, in an interview prior to Oscar night.

2016 ceremony 
On October 21, 2015, the Academy of Motion Picture Arts and Sciences announced Rock would host the 88th Academy Awards the following February. When the subsequent acting nominations turned out to include no racial minorities, Rock was called upon to join a boycott of the ceremony. Rock declined, stating at the ceremony that it would have accomplished little since the show would have proceeded anyway, with him simply replaced. Instead, Rock spoke of his concerns about the lack of diversity in AMPAS at various times during the show, closing by saying "Black Lives Matter".

Rock's performance was largely praised by critics. Los Angeles Times critic Mary McNamara wrote: "Rock's Oscars had some of the most powerful moments seen in the telecast's history. His decision to honestly answer the question 'Is Hollywood racist?' was brave and effective," The New York Times television critic James Poniewozik, praised Rock's performance for being "evenhanded without being wishy-washy" and that he represented "an example of something the industry is still trying to learn: that you can achieve both inclusion and entertainment by giving the right person just the right opportunity."

2022 ceremony

Rock presented the award for Best Documentary Feature at the 94th Academy Awards in March 2022. During the ceremony, Rock joked about Jada Pinkett Smith's shaved head, which he compared to Demi Moore's shaved head in G.I. Jane, saying: "Jada, I love ya. G.I. Jane 2, can't wait to see it!". Pinkett Smith had shaved her head due to alopecia areata. Her husband, Will Smith, responded to Rock's joke by walking onstage and slapping Rock, who remarked: "Will Smith just smacked the shit out of me". Smith then returned to his seat and yelled twice at Rock, "Keep my wife's name out your fucking mouth!" Rock went on to say that this "was the greatest night in the history of television." Later in the night, Smith was named Best Actor for King Richard, and while accepting the award, he apologized to the Academy and the other nominees, but not to Rock, in his acceptance speech. Rock declined to file a report with the Los Angeles Police Department regarding the incident.

The next day, amid public backlash, Smith issued a formal apology to Rock via a public Instagram post, adding that "a joke about Jada's medical condition was too much for me to bear and I reacted emotionally." He also stated that "I was out of line" and that his behavior was "unacceptable and inexcusable." During a stand-up performance in Boston later that month, Rock stated that Smith had not reached out to him personally and they had not spoken since the ceremony.

Claims that Rock had apologized circulated on social media but were debunked. There has been no verified public apology from Rock to Smith or Pinkett Smith.

Music videos

Rock's first music video was for his song "Your Mother's Got a Big Head" from his album Born Suspect. Rock also made videos for his songs "Champagne" from Roll With the New and "No Sex (In the Champagne Room)" from Bigger & Blacker.

He directed and appeared in the music video for the Red Hot Chili Peppers song "Hump de Bump", and has simply appeared in several videos, including the Big Daddy Kane music video "Smooth Operator" as a guy getting his hair cut, one of the many celebrities seen lip-synching in Johnny Cash's "God's Gonna Cut You Down", a cameo in Madonna's "Bitch I'm Madonna", and as a Wild West sheriff chasing down an 1889 cowboy version of Lil Nas X in "Old Town Road".

Stage plays
In 2011, Rock appeared on Broadway in Stephen Adly Guirgis' play The Motherfucker with the Hat with Bobby Cannavale and Annabella Sciorra. Rock was nominated for a Drama League Award. In an interview with Vibe magazine, Rock stated that he chose to do Broadway because he wanted more people to see him "really act. Sometimes when you do comedy, that can be a little formulaic, and it's hard for really good directors to see that you can act."

Comedic style and views
Rock's subject matter typically involves family, politics, romance, music, celebrities, and race relations in the United States. Though not strictly autobiographical, much of his comic standpoint seems rooted in his teenage experience; his strict parents, concerned about the inadequacies of the local school system, arranged to have the adolescent Rock bused to a nearly all-white high school in Bensonhurst. In his memoir Rock This, he recalls, "My parents assumed I'd get a better education in a better neighborhood. What I actually got was a worse education in a worse neighborhood. And a whole bunch of ass-whippings."

Rock has not wavered from a position explored in his 1996 Roll With The New show, and reiterated in his 1997 memoir: "Why does the public expect entertainers to behave better than everybody else? It's  course, this is just for black entertainers. You don't see anyone telling Jerry Seinfeld he's a good role model. Because everyone expects whites to behave  you've got to be an entertainer and a leader. It's too much." Often the subject of tabloids, when asked about paparazzi and the other negative aspects of fame, Rock says he accepts the bad with the good: "You can't be happy that fire cooks your food and be mad it burns your fingertips."

At the London Live Earth concert on July 7, 2007, which was broadcast live on the BBC, before introducing the Red Hot Chili Peppers, Rock called the crowd "motherfuckers" and said "shit", and after a brief pause said he was joking. Due to the broadcast being at 5:45p.m., Rock was immediately cut off, and the BBC made several apologies for his use of the word "motherfucker".

Chris Rock has been an avid fan of the New York Mets baseball team since childhood. He complained that his team "had no money" during a 2011 interview with David Letterman.

During a 2008 rant on his Kill the Messenger tour, Rock labeled George W. Bush as "the worst president ever".

In May 2021, Rock voiced opposition to cancel culture. He said that it has led to "boring" and "unfunny" material from comedians. He also commented that there is an existing built-in mechanism for audiences informing comedians that their content does not work, like the audience not laughing at their jokes. Rock went on to say "Everybody's scared to make a move. That's not a place to be. You know, we should have the right to fail because  failure is a part of art."

Rock has said that he was influenced by the performing style of his paternal grandfather, Allen Rock, a preacher. Rock's comedy influences are Bill Cosby, Redd Foxx, Dick Gregory, Flip Wilson, Richard Pryor, Steve Martin, Pigmeat Markham, Woody Allen, Bill Maher,
Eddie Murphy, Sam Kinison, George Carlin, Mort Sahl, and Rodney Dangerfield.

Comedians who have cited Rock as an influence include Dave Chappelle, Christian Finnegan, George Lopez, Kevin Hart, and Trevor Noah.

Personal life
Rock married Malaak Compton-Rock on November 23, 1996. Compton-Rock is the founder and executive director of StyleWorks, a non-profit, full-service hair salon that provides free services for women leaving welfare and entering the workforce. The couple lived in Alpine, New Jersey with their two daughters. In December 2014, Rock filed for divorce from Compton-Rock. Rock admitted to infidelity in the marriage, as well as struggling with a pornography addiction. The divorce was finalized on August 22, 2016.

Rock has campaigned against the racial profiling of African-Americans, and often speaks of the everyday racism he experiences “despite being famous”. In a 2013 episode of Comedians in Cars Getting Coffee with Jerry Seinfeld, Rock and Seinfeld are pulled over by the police for speeding while Seinfeld was driving. In the episode Rock admits to Seinfeld that "If you weren't here, I'd be scared. Yeah, I'm famous – still black." In 2015, Rock was pulled over three times in the first three months of the year. Each time Rock posted a selfie of the incident, without further comment as to the reason for the stops or whether he was issued a citation.

On August 20, 2019, Rock, along with several other celebrities, invested in a funding round for Lowell Herb Co, a California cannabis brand. He is known to be "a dedicated cannabis consumer."

On September 18, 2020, Rock said that he was diagnosed with a non-verbal learning disorder, a neurological condition that makes it difficult for him to understand non-verbal social cues.

On September 19, 2021, Rock announced on Twitter that he had been tested positive for COVID-19. He strongly advocated getting vaccinated to his followers.

On July 7, 2022, it was reported that Rock had started dating actress, screenwriter, and director Lake Bell.

In 2012, Rock settled a lawsuit with allegations of sexual abuse. Rock was not charged with the crime and has denied that the rape ever occurred. The accuser said "she wanted the court papers public so people would know her - story".

Filmography

Discography 
 Comedy albums
 Born Suspect (Atlantic Records, 1991)
 Roll with the New (DreamWorks Records, 1997)
 Bigger & Blacker (DreamWorks Records, 1999)
 Never Scared (DreamWorks Records/Geffen Records, 2004)
 Tamborine (Netflix Studios, LLC., 2018)

 Standup specials
 Chris Rock: Big Ass Jokes (released on HBO, 1994)
 Chris Rock: Bring the Pain (released on HBO, 1996)
 Chris Rock: Bigger & Blacker (released on HBO, 1999)
 Chris Rock: Never Scared (released on HBO, 2004)
 Chris Rock: Kill the Messenger (released on HBO, 2008)
 Chris Rock: Tamborine (released on Netflix 2018)
 Chris Rock: Selective Outrage (released on Netflix 2023)

Awards and nominations

Book 
 Rock This! (Hyperion Books, 1997) –

References

External links

 
 
 

 
1965 births
Living people
20th-century American comedians
20th-century American male actors
21st-century American comedians
21st-century American male actors
African-American film directors
African-American film producers
African-American male actors
African-American male comedians
African-American male writers
African-American screenwriters
African-American stand-up comedians
African-American television producers
African-American television talk show hosts
American film producers
American male comedians
American male comedy actors
American male film actors
American male screenwriters
American male television actors
American male voice actors
American music video directors
American people of Cameroonian descent
American sketch comedians
American stand-up comedians
American television talk show hosts
Atlantic Records artists
Comedians from New Jersey
Comedians from New York City
Comedians from South Carolina
DreamWorks Records artists
Film directors from New Jersey
Film directors from New York City
Film directors from South Carolina
Film producers from New Jersey
Film producers from New York (state)
Geffen Records artists
Grammy Award winners
James Madison High School (Brooklyn) alumni
Male actors from New Jersey
Male actors from New York City
Male actors from South Carolina
People from Alpine, New Jersey
People from Andrews, South Carolina
People from Bedford–Stuyvesant, Brooklyn
People from Crown Heights, Brooklyn
Primetime Emmy Award winners
Screenwriters from New Jersey
Screenwriters from New York (state)
Screenwriters from South Carolina
Television producers from New Jersey
Television producers from New York City
Writers from Brooklyn
Writers from New Jersey
Writers from South Carolina